At the 1896 Summer Olympics, two weightlifting events were contested (men's one hand lift and two hand lift).  The top two places were won by the same two men in each event, though their order was reversed for the two events.  The bronze medals were split by the two Greek weightlifters.  A total of seven men from five nations competed.

Medal summary
These medals are retroactively assigned by the International Olympic Committee; at the time, winners were given a silver medal and subsequent places received no award.

Participating nations
A total of 7 weightlifters from 5 nations competed at the Athens Games:

Medal table
These medals are retroactively assigned by the International Olympic Committee; at the time, winners were given a silver medal and subsequent places received no award.

See also
List of Olympic medalists in weightlifting

References

Sources
  (Digitally available at )
  (Excerpt available at )
 

 
1896 Summer Olympics events
1896